Gustavo Marzi (25 November 1908 – 14 November 1966) was an Italian fencer. He competed in foil and sabre events at the 1928, 1932 and 1936 Olympics and won a gold or silver medal in every event he entered, except for individual sabre in 1928, in which he finished fourth. In total he won two gold and five silver medals.

At the world championships, which were unofficial through 1935, he won 10 titles: two in the individual foil (1935, 1937), seven in team foil (1929–31, 1934–35, 1937–38) and one in team sabre (1938). He died from a lung cancer, aged 57.

See also
 Italy national fencing team – Multiple medallist

References

1908 births
1966 deaths
Italian male fencers
Olympic fencers of Italy
Fencers at the 1928 Summer Olympics
Fencers at the 1932 Summer Olympics
Fencers at the 1936 Summer Olympics
Olympic gold medalists for Italy
Olympic silver medalists for Italy
Olympic medalists in fencing
Medalists at the 1928 Summer Olympics
Medalists at the 1932 Summer Olympics
Medalists at the 1936 Summer Olympics
Deaths from lung cancer in Friuli Venezia Giulia